= The Swedish School in Majorca =

International school in Spain

Coordinates: 39.56337°N 2.62464°E

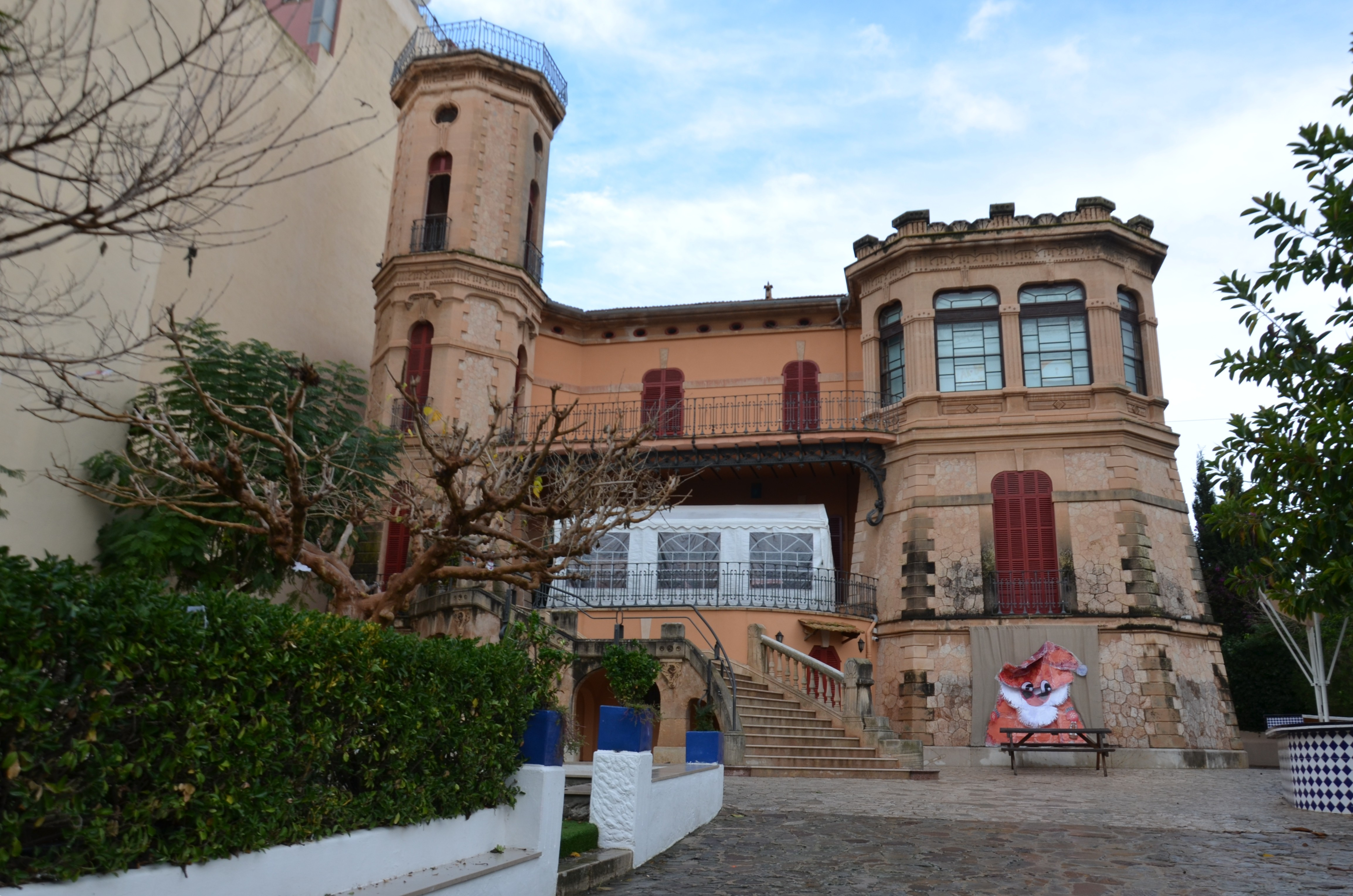
Swedish School

The Swedish School in Majorca is a private school (pre-school, beginning at age 3, through secondary level) in Palma, Mallorca, Spain. Its courses are multilingual: approximately 60% of the instruction is in Swedish; the remainder is in Spanish and English.

== Administration ==
The school is funded by student fees, augmented by participation from the government of Sweden. A board of directors oversees the operation; a School Director is hired by this Board to operate the school. The school's studies are operated per regulations of the Swedish school system, in coordination with Spanish school authorities.

Graduates of the Swedish School receive an International Degree, but its requirements are the same as those of schools in Sweden.

The Swedish School participates in a pupil exchange programme with a school in Sweden from the island of Gotland. It also has an arrangement with a school in Stockholm.

The School also offers Distance Learning, via internet classes.

== Language classes ==
From the first year, students are taught in Spanish, both in conversation and formal studies (oral and written). English is used where appropriate, more in the activities and stage presentations than Spanish. In addition, the school offers weekly Swedish-maintenance classes, for persons who wish to maintain their knowledge of the language, and adult-study classes for learning Swedish and Spanish.

== Eating ==
The school provides a weekday lunch and afternoon snack to students.

== Sports and recreation ==
Twice-weekly classes are provided at a local sports facility. In addition, the island offers ample opportunities for outdoor activities, from water sports to hiking to horseback riding.

Monthly field trips are organized to various sites, for vocational or cultural instruction.

The school organizes musical and theater productions. The school year is capped with a June musical presentation in which all participate.

The school shares an activity field ("Recreation Square") with the German School in Majorca.
